Steel Flower is a 2015 South Korean film starring Jeong Ha-dam. Written and directed by Park Suk-young, it depicts the story of a young homeless girl struggling to make a living in Busan.

It made its world premiere at the 20th Busan International Film Festival in 2015. Since then, it has won numerous awards.

Plot
A young homeless girl, Ha-dam, moves to Busan in the hopes of finding work, only to be rebuffed at every turn.

Cast
 Jeong Ha-dam as Ha-dam
 Kim Tae-hee as Japanese restaurant owner
 Yu An as a woman who "hires" but fails to pay Ha-dam to hand out advertising leaflets
 Park Myung-hoon as seafood restaurant owner
 Choi Moon-soo as a woman who has an ugly physical confrontation Ha-dam

Awards and nominations

Reception
Jeong Ha-dam was praised for her performance, with the film itself receiving overall positive critical reception.

References

External links 
 
 

2015 films
2010s Korean-language films
South Korean drama films
2010s South Korean films